Shueyville is a city in Johnson County, Iowa, United States. It is part of the Iowa City, Iowa Metropolitan Statistical Area. The population was 731 at the time of the 2020 census.

History
Shueyville was founded in 1855 by Jacob Shuey, who emigrated from Augusta County, Virginia. The initial population of the town was Shuey and his extended family. Shuey also donated the land on which was built Western College, which later became Leander Clark College.

Geography
Shueyville is located at  (41.848155, -91.648679).

Notable people
 Scott Schebler, major league baseball player
 Robin Lord Taylor, film and television actor
 Hailey Whitters, Country music singer

Demographics

2010 census
As of the census of 2010, there were 577 people, 204 households, and 173 families living in the city. The racial makeup of the city was 97.1% White, 0.3% African American, 0.2% Native American, 1.4% Asian, and 1.0% from two or more races. Hispanic or Latino of any race were 1.0% of the population.

There were 204 households, of which 42.6% had children under the age of 18 living with them, 78.9% were married couples living together, 3.9% had a female householder with no husband present, 2.0% had a male householder with no wife present, and 15.2% were non-families. 10.8% of all households were made up of individuals, and 1.5% had someone living alone who was 65 years of age or older. The average household size was 2.83 and the average family size was 3.06.

The median age in the city was 40.6 years. 28.2% of residents were under the age of 18; 4.6% were between the ages of 18 and 24; 24.8% were from 25 to 44; 36.6% were from 45 to 64; and 5.9% were 65 years of age or older. The gender makeup of the city was 47.7% male and 52.3% female.

2000 census
As of the census of 2000, there were 250 people, 95 households, and 70 families living in the city. The racial makeup of the city was 99.20% White, 0.40% Asian, and 0.40% from two or more races. Hispanic or Latino of any race were 0.40% of the population.

There were 95 households, out of which 35.8% had children under the age of 18 living with them, 67.4% were married couples living together, 5.3% had a female householder with no husband present, and 25.3% were non-families. 22.1% of all households were made up of individuals, and 5.3% had someone living alone who was 65 years of age or older. The average household size was 2.63 and the average family size was 3.07.

26.8% are under the age of 18, 6.4% from 18 to 24, 33.2% from 25 to 44, 25.6% from 45 to 64, and 8.0% who were 65 years of age or older. The median age was 36 years. For every 100 females, there were 101.6 males. For every 100 females age 18 and over, there were 101.1 males.

The median income for a household in the city was $61,875, and the median income for a family was $66,875. Males had a median income of $41,364 versus $26,136 for females. The per capita income for the city was $24,690. None of the families and 1.8% of the population were living below the poverty line.

References

External links
 City Data Statistical Data and more about Shueyville, Iowa
 City website City of Shueyville, Iowa web site

Cities in Johnson County, Iowa
Cities in Iowa
Iowa City metropolitan area
1855 establishments in Iowa
Populated places established in 1855